Rostislav Šnajnar (born January 21, 1997) is a Czech professional ice hockey player. He is currently playing for HC ZUBR Přerov of the Czech 1.liga.

Šnajnar made his Czech Extraliga debut playing with HC Kometa Brno during the 2015-16 Czech Extraliga season.

References

External links

1997 births
Living people
People from Brno-Country District
HC Kometa Brno players
HC ZUBR Přerov players
Czech ice hockey defencemen
Sportspeople from the South Moravian Region
Orli Znojmo players